A saucier or sauté chef is a position in the classical brigade style kitchen. It can be translated into English as sauce chef. In addition to preparing sauces, the saucier prepares stews, hot hors d'œuvres, and sautés food to order. Although it is often considered the highest position of the station cooks, the saucier is typically still tertiary to the chef and sous-chef.

Escoffier definition
In Georges Auguste Escoffier's system of the classic kitchen brigade, outlined in his Guide Culinaire, the saucier is "responsible for all sautéed items and most sauces".

Sauciers in popular culture
The 1979 film Apocalypse Now character, "Chef" Hicks (played by Frederic Forrest) says that he was "raised to be a saucier" in New Orleans. 

In Tropic Thunder, the character Kirk Lazarus (played by Robert Downey Jr.) claims to have been a saucier in San Antonio in reference to Apocalypse Now.

In Futurama, Bender Bending Rodriguez claims the title of "Zinc Saucier" (instead of Iron Chef) after defeating Elzar in The 30% Iron Chef.

In Futurama, Bender Bending Rodriguez gets a job at Elzar's restaurant (to pay off Planet Express's presumed free meal). He asks Elzar if he can be "pastry chef, saucier, soup guy". Instead, Elzar hands him a toilet plunger, using his catchphrase "Bam!" in Bender Gets Made.

See also

 List of restaurant terminology

References

Chefs
Cookware and bakeware
Restaurant terminology
Culinary terminology